Mayo County Council is the authority responsible for local government in County Mayo, Ireland. As a county council, it is governed by the Local Government Act 2001. The council is responsible for housing and community, roads and transportation, urban planning and development, amenity and culture, and environment. The council has 30 elected members. Elections are held every five years and are by single transferable vote. The head of the council has the title of Cathaoirleach (Chairperson). The county administration is headed by a Chief Executive, Kevin Kelly. The county town is Castlebar.

History
Originally meetings of Mayo County Council took place in Castlebar Courthouse. The county council moved to modern facilities at County Hall further west on The Mall in Castlebar in 1989.

In the early 1930s, the County Council was dissolved for a time and replaced with a Commissioner because of the Mayo librarian controversy.

Local Electoral Areas and Municipal Districts
Mayo County Council is divided into the following municipal districts and local electoral areas, defined by electoral divisions.

Councillors

2019 seats summary

Councillors by electoral area
This list reflects the order in which councillors were elected on 24 May 2019.

Changes in affiliation

Assessment
Mayo County Council was identified in 2011 by An Taisce, the national trust, as among the worst county councils in Ireland's planning system during the period 2000–11.

County councils in Ireland were assessed by the organisation in relation to overzoning; decisions reversed by An Bord Pleanála after being passed by a local authority; percentage of vacant housing stock; and percentage of one-off houses permitted. An Taisce's report of its findings described the results as "stark and troubling".

In Mayo, many council planning decisions were overturned because the council violated their own County Development Plan. Overdevelopment in Mayo was another problem identified, with too many vacant houses in the county (not inclusive of holiday homes). A spokesman for An Taisce commented, "Mayo didn’t do well on one-off houses either. What a lot of local authorities don’t seem to appreciate is that it is more expensive to provide infrastructure to one-off houses in the countryside than it is to do so to estates."

References

External links

Politics of County Mayo
County councils in the Republic of Ireland